Mammilla melanostoma is a species of predatory sea snail, a marine gastropod mollusk in the family Naticidae, the moon snails.

Description

Distribution
This marine species occurs off Papua New Guinea.

References

 Hollman M. (2008) Naticidae. In Poppe G.T. (ed.) Philippine marine mollusks, vol. 1: 482-501, pls 186-195. Hackenheim: Conchbooks
 Torigoe K. & Inaba A. (2011). Revision on the classification of Recent Naticidae. Bulletin of the Nishinomiya Shell Museum. 7: 133 + 15 pp., 4 pls
 Zhang S.-P. [Suping]. (2016). Fauna Sinica. Invertebrata 56. Mollusca: Gastropoda: Strombacea and Naticacea. Beijing: Science Press. 317 pp., 10 pl
 Saito H. (2017). Family Naticidae. Pp. 858-866, in: T. Okutani (ed.), Marine Mollusks in Japan, ed. 2. 2 vols. Tokai University Press. 1375 pp

External links
 Vermes. In: Gmelin J.F. (Ed.) Caroli a Linnaei Systema Naturae per Regna Tria Naturae, Ed. 13. Tome 1(6). G.E. Beer, Lipsiae [Leipzig. pp. 3021-3910]
 Reeve, L. A. (1855). Monograph of the genus Natica. In: Conchologia Iconica, or, illustrations of the shells of molluscous animals, vol. 9, pls 1-30, and unpaginated text. L. Reeve & Co., London
 Philippi, R. A. (1849-1853). Die Gattungen Natica und Amaura. In Abbildungen nach der Natur mit Beschreibungen. In: Küster, H. C., Ed. Systematisches Conchylien-Cabinet von Martini und Chemnitz. Neu herausgegeben und vervollständigt. Zweiten Bandes erste Abtheilung.
 Kabat A.R. (2000) Results of the Rumphius Biohistorical Expedition to Ambon (1990). Part 10. Mollusca, Gastropoda, Naticidae. Zoologische Mededelingen 73(25): 345-380. 
 Huelsken T., Tapken D., Dahlmann T., Wägele H., Riginos C. & Hollmann M. (2012) Systematics and phylogenetic species delimitation within Polinices s.l. (Caenogastropoda: Naticidae) based on molecular data and shell morphology. Organisms, Diversity & Evolution 12: 349-375

Naticidae
Gastropods described in 1791